Progress M-58, identified by NASA as Progress 23P, was a Progress spacecraft used to resupply the International Space Station. It was a Progress-M 11F615A55 spacecraft, with the serial number 358.

Launch
Progress M-58 was launched by a Soyuz-U carrier rocket from Site 1/5 at the Baikonur Cosmodrome. Launch occurred at 13:40:36 UTC on 23 October 2006.

Docking
The spacecraft docked with the aft port of the Zvezda module at 14:28:46 UTC on 26 October 2006. During docking a problem with the spacecraft's telemetry system produced a false reading that an antenna associated with its Kurs docking system had failed to retract, complicating the docking procedure. It remained docked for 152 days before undocking at 18:11 UTC on 27 March 2007. It was deorbited at 22:44:30 UTC on 27 March 2007. The spacecraft burned up in the atmosphere over the Pacific Ocean, with any remaining debris landing in the ocean at around 23:30:22 GMT.

Progress M-58 carried supplies to the International Space Station, including food, water and oxygen for the crew and equipment for conducting scientific research.

See also

 List of Progress flights
 Uncrewed spaceflights to the International Space Station

References

Spacecraft launched in 2006
Progress (spacecraft) missions
Spacecraft which reentered in 2007
Supply vehicles for the International Space Station
Spacecraft launched by Soyuz-U rockets